Senator Floyd-Jones may refer to:

David R. Floyd-Jones (1813–1871), New York State Senate
Henry Floyd-Jones (1792–1862), New York State Senate

See also
Senator Floyd (disambiguation)
Senator Jones (disambiguation)